This is a list of the foreign ministers of Turkmenistan. The position was established in 1944 and was re-established after Turkmenistan gained its independence in 1991. The position of foreign minister has been held by Raşit Meredow since 2001.

List of foreign ministers of the Turkmen SSR 
 1944–1951 – Kara Aliev
 1951–1958 – Balyş Öwezow
 1958–1959 – Juma Karaev
 1959–1960 – Balyş Öwezow
 1960–1963 – Abdy Annaliyev
 1963–1969 – Muhammetnazar Gapurow   
 1969–1975 – Oraz Orazmukhamedov
 1975–1978 – Bally Yazkuliyev
 1978–1979 – Chary Karriyev                               
 1979–1985 – Nazar Suýunow                          
 1985–1988 – Roza Bazarova         
 1988–1990 – Tuvakbibi Amangeldyeva

List of foreign ministers of Turkmenistan 
 1990–1992 – Awdy Kulyýew
 1992–1995 – Halykberdy Atayew
 1995–2000 – Boris Şyhmyradow
 2000–2001 – Batyr Berdiýew
 2001–present – Raşit Meredow

See also 
 Ministry of Foreign Affairs (Turkmenistan)

References 

Foreign ministers
Government ministers of Turkmenistan
Foreign relations of Turkmenistan